Anny van Doorne (26 February 1930 – 6 April 2004) was a Dutch equestrian. She competed in two events at the 1972 Summer Olympics.

References

1930 births
2004 deaths
Dutch female equestrians
Dutch dressage riders
Olympic equestrians of the Netherlands
Equestrians at the 1972 Summer Olympics
Sportspeople from Eindhoven
20th-century Dutch women